Andrés Centenera (born 1914, date of death unknown) was a Filipino character actor. He was the grandfather of Filipino singer Rafael Centenera. He appeared in films from 1937 to 1979.

Andres Centenera, born in Goa, Camarines Sur. He was the son of Doña Rita Garchitorena and Don Candido Garcia Centenera. He was the grandson of Don Andres Garchitorena, member of Aguinaldo's Hong Kong Junta and Governor of Ambos Camarines.

In 1975, he was cast as the village chieftain in NV Productions' Banaue starring superstars Nora Aunor and Christopher de Leon.

Centenera also worked as a boxing referee. In 1983, it was noted that Centenera was deceased.

Filmography
1937 - Teniente Rosario
1938 - Alipin ng Palad (Sampaguita Pictures)
1938 - Dahong Lagas (Sampaguita Pictures)
1939 - Punit na Bandila (X'Otic)
1939 - Tatlong Pagkabirhen (X'Otic)
1939 - Ang Kaban ng Tipan (X'Otic)
1949 - Alamat ng Perlas Na Itim (Lawin Pictures|Lawin)
1949 - Bulakenyo (Liwayway Films) 
1950 - Siete Infantes de Lara (MC)
1950 - Genghis Khan (MC)
1951 - Sigfredo (Lebran)
1951 - Romeo at Julieta (Lebran)
1952 - Kalbaryo ni Hesus (Lebran)
1956 - Buhay at Pag-ibig ni Dr. Jose Rizal (Balatbat & Bagumbayan)
1957 - Kahariang Bato (Tamaraw Studios)
1958 - Kilabot sa Sta. Barbara (Tamaraw Studios)
1961 - Noli Me Tángere
1965 - Tagani
1965 - Once Before I Die
1968 - Brides of Blood
1968 - Escape to Mindanao
1971 - Beast of the Yellow Night
1972 - The Big Bird Cage
1973 - The Twilight People
1973 - Beyond Atlantis
1974 - Black Mamba
1975 - Banaue: Stairway to the Sky

References

External links

1914 births
Year of death missing
Filipino male film actors
Male actors from Camarines Sur